Cueshé is a Filipino pop rock band from Cebu, Philippines, currently based in Manila. The band was formed in 1998 and hit mainstream in 2005.

Background
Formed in 1998 in Cebu by Fritz Labrado, Jovan Mabini and Mike Manaloto, the word Cueshé is a portmanteau of "Cue", from banana cue; a snack delicacy in the Philippines, which are skewered bananas coated with caramel, and the pronoun "shé" (pronounced shay) is a reference to their former vocalist, which is a female (she) who joined in 1999. After the female vocalist left with their songwriter in 2001, she was replaced by Jay Justiniani. Jhunjie Dosdos and Ruben Caballero were later recruited in 2002 and 2003 respectively.

In March 2005, the band decided to move to the Philippine capital of Manila and signs to BMG Records two months later. The group achieved hit singles ("Stay", "Sorry", "Ulan", "Can't Let You Go" and "24 Hours"), a double platinum album (Half Empty, Half Full), accolades (Favorite Artist, Favorite Group and Favorite Song—for the song "Stay" at the 1st MYX Music Awards; SMART Texters’ Choice Hitmaker of the Year at the 2006 MTV Pilipinas Awards; Band of the Year at the 2006 SOP PasiklaBand Awards; and Best Breakthrough Artist at the 2005 SOP Music Awards), within the span of a year.

Less than a year later, the band released their second album, Back to Me. The new album contained ten new tracks, all of which were written by the band members themselves. The first single from the album was of the same title, followed by three more singles "Borrowed Time", "Bakit?" and "Pasensya Na". Being fans of The Beatles, they also did a cover of the John Lennon hit single "Jealous Guy". In 2008, a third album was released entitled Driven, which spawned the three singles "BMD", "There Was You" and "Minsan". In 2010 the band release their fourth and latest album Life, containing the singles "Pangako", "Lupit", and "Sana".

The band also made a contribution to The Eraserheads tribute album, Ultraelectromagneticjam!: The Music Of The Eraserheads, on which they sang their own rendition of "Hard To Believe" (originally from the album Sticker Happy; released in 1997).

The band also recorded the theme song of the Philippine television series Asian Treasures entitled "Walang Yamang (Mas Hihigit Sa 'Yo)", which is included in the repackaged version of their album Back to Me.

In 2015, the band released a new single titled "Ikaw Lamang" and announced they were to release a new album soon. The music video premiered in September 2015.

Members
Ruben Caballero — lead vocals, rhythm guitar (2003–present)
Jovan Mabini — lead guitar (1998–present); backing vocals (2012–present)
Fritz Labrado — bass guitar (1998–present); backing vocals (2015–present)
Cesar delos Santos — drums (2012–present)

Former members
Jay Justiniani — vocals (2001–2015)
Mike Manaloto — drums (1998–2012)
Jhunjie Dosdos — keyboards, backing vocals (2002–2012)

Discography

Albums
Half Empty Half Full (2005)
Back to Me (2006)
Driven (2008)
Life (2010)

Awards and nominations

ASAP 2nd Platinum Circle
2006: Double Platinum "Half Empty Half Full "
ASAP 24K Gold Award
2007: Gold album "Back To Me"
2006: Platinum "Ultraelectromagneticjam"
MOR Naga
2005: No.1 for 5 weeks "Stay"

References

External links

Cueshe Story and Song Lyrics
https://web.archive.org/web/20060212104822/http://www.titikpilipino.com/news/index.php?aid=647

Filipino rock music groups
Cebuano rock bands
Musical groups established in 1998
Musical groups from Cebu